Sydney Bertram Carter  (6 May 1915 – 13 March 2004) was an English poet, songwriter, and folk musician who was born in Camden Town, London. He is best known for the song "Lord of the Dance" (1967), whose music is based on the "Shaker Allegro" more commonly known as the song "Simple Gifts", and the song "The Crow on the Cradle". His other notable songs include "Julian of Norwich" (sometimes called "The Bells of Norwich"), based on words of Julian of Norwich, "One More Step Along the World I Go", "When I Needed a Neighbour", "Friday Morning", "Every Star Shall Sing a Carol", "The Youth of the Heart", "Down Below" and "Sing John Ball".

Biography
Born in Camden Town London Carter studied at Montem Street Primary School in Finsbury Park, Christ's Hospital school in Horsham, West Sussex and Balliol College, Oxford, graduating in history in 1936.

A committed pacifist, he registered as a conscientious objector in World War II and joined the Friends' Ambulance Unit, serving in Egypt, Palestine and Greece.

In 1964 he married his second wife Leela Nair, with whom he had a son, the neurosurgeon Michael Carter.

Career

Carter worked as a lyricist for Donald Swann's revues and musicals in the 1950s and in 1962 produced an album, Putting out the Dustbin, with Sheila Hancock.  "Last Cigarette", a song from the album about failing to give up smoking became a minor hit. In 1968, rock band Reflection released The Present Tense (Songs of Sydney Carter), incorporating his poetry and songs.

In 1972, a collection of his poems, Love More or Less, was described in a review by Michael Grosvenor Myer in the EFDSS magazine English Dance and Song as the work of "an impressive spokesman for the believer in an age of general unbelief".

He continued to work with Donald Swann, writing six songs for the 1964 Donald Swann EP, Songs of Faith and Doubt. In the 1960s he also worked as a critic for Gramophone magazine. In 1965 Carter wrote the six-song EP album Lord of the Dance with Martin Carthy on guitar, the Johnny Scott Trio and the Mike Sammes singers. He also worked with Nadia Cattouse and Jeremy Taylor.

In 1972 Carter presented a series of concerts in Australia. Franciscus Henri who accompanied him recorded an anthology of Carter's songs and poems (Nothing Fixed or Final) in 2005. Also in 1972, Bob and Carole Pegg recorded a collection of his songs with him, And Now It Is So Early.

In 1981, an all-star collection of English folk musicians released Lovely in the Dances, a compilation of his songs. Performers included Shusha, Maddy Prior, and John Kirkpatrick.

References

Bibliography
 Nothing Fixed or Final (1969)
 Love More or Less (1971)
 The Two-Way Clock (Nothing Fixed or Final and Love More or Less with 29 additional poems (1974)
 The Rock of Doubt (1978)
 Dance in the Dark (1980)

External links

 Sydney Carter & "Lord of the Dance" at Stainer & Bell
Obituary: The Telegraph 
 The Daily Telegraph

1915 births
2004 deaths
People from Camden Town
People educated at Christ's Hospital
British conscientious objectors
People associated with the Friends' Ambulance Unit
English Quakers
English songwriters
English nonconformist hymnwriters
English male poets
Burials at West Norwood Cemetery
20th-century English male writers